Tharald Høyerup Blanc (December 6, 1838 – April 18, 1921) was a Norwegian theatre historian.

He was born in Bergen. In addition to being a theatre critic in several newspapers and periodicals, he wrote several books which even today are marked by objectivity. His most important books are Norges første nationale scene (1884), Christiania Theaters historie 1827–77 (1899) and Henrik Ibsen og Christiania Theater 1850–99 (1906).

References

1838 births
1921 deaths
Theatre people from Bergen
Historians of theatre
Norwegian theatre critics
Henrik Ibsen researchers
19th-century Norwegian journalists
20th-century Norwegian journalists
Journalists from Bergen